Æthelsige (or Æthelsige I) was a medieval Bishop of Sherborne.

Æthelsige was consecrated between 978 and 979. He died between 991 and 993.

Citations

References

External links
 

Bishops of Sherborne (ancient)
990s deaths
10th-century English bishops
Year of birth unknown